Conor Glynn Shaughnessy (born 30 June 1996) is an Irish professional footballer who plays as a central defender for League One team Burton Albion. 

He is also able to operate as a central midfielder. He has represented the Republic of Ireland national football team at U15 through to U21 level.

Club career

Reading
Shaughnessy started his career at English club Reading, joining in 2012 after a successful trial and signing his first professional contract in the summer of 2013. He was a regular for the Reading U18 and U21 teams; however, he never played competitively for the club and was released in May 2016.

Leeds United
Following a successful trial, Shaughnessy was given a one-year contract with the Leeds United development squad in September 2016. He did not make any first team appearances during the 2016-2017 season. His contract was extended by a year in May 2017, and he made his professional debut in a 3–2 away victory over Bolton Wanderers on 6 August 2017, replacing injured teammate Matthew Pennington at centre back in the 66th minute and promptly giving away a penalty. He made his first start in the following game, on 9 August 2017 in a 4–1 League Cup victory against Port Vale at Elland Road, and first League start six days later against Fulham. He signed a new four-year contract with Leeds the following month. On 7 January 2018, Shaughnessy scored an own goal in Leeds' 2–1 shock defeat to Newport County in the FA Cup.

Shaughnessy picked up a serious ankle injury when he started in Leeds' 0-0 draw against Hull City on 30 January 2018, with head coach Thomas Christiansen revealing Shaughnessy could spend several weeks/months out injured. The injury ultimately ruled Shaughnessy out for the remainder of the season.

On 14 August 2018, Shaughnessy returned to a match-day squad for the first time, when he was named on the bench for Leeds in the EFL Cup fixture against Bolton Wanderers. He made his first appearance after injury when he started against Preston North End on 28 August 2018. The return to form - and from injury - of Leeds' back line limited Shaughnessy's playing time with the first team, but an interview in September 2018 indicated that Head Coach Marcelo Bielsa had firm plans for the youngster in the 2018-19 campaign and beyond.

Hearts loan
On 7 January 2019, Shaughnessy joined Hearts on a 6 month loan deal. He made his debut on 20 January starting for Hearts in a 1-0 win against Livingston in the Scottish FA Cup, before making his league debut on 23 January in the SPL against Dundee.

On 25 May 2019, Shaughnessy received a 2018–19 Scottish Cup Runners Up medal after being named on the bench for the Scottish Cup final at Hampden Park after losing 1-2 in the final against Celtic. In total he made 11 appearances for Hearts in all competitions.

Mansfield Town loan
On 2 September 2019, Shaughnessy joined League Two side Mansfield Town on a season-long loan after failing to fit into Bielsa's immediate plans.

Burton Albion loan
After his loan at Mansfield was ended early, Shaughnessy signed on loan for League One club Burton Albion on 13 January 2020 for the rest of the 2019–20 season.

Rochdale
On 1 February 2021, Shaughnessy joined Rochdale on an 18 month contract.

Burton Albion
Shaughnessy left Rochdale during the 2021 summer window and made a permanent move to Burton Albion where he made 43 appearances for The Brewers during the 2021-22 season, including three league goals in his 38 League One outings.

Early in the 2022-23 season, the defender was injured in a 0-1 loss to Ipswich Town, following a fifth-minute collision with the Ipswich upright and was out for the remainder of August, all of September and October.

International career
Shaughnessy has represented Ireland at U15, U16, U17, U18 and U21 level. After his loan move to Hearts he expressed his hopes that he would get a senior international call up similar to fellow Irish under 21 centre back Jimmy Dunne whom he replaced at Tynecastle.

Personal life
Shaughnessy's elder brother Joe is also a professional footballer and plays for Scottish Premiership side St.Mirren.

Honours

Player
Hearts
Scottish Cup 2018–19: Runner Up

Career statistics

References

External links

1996 births
Living people
Sportspeople from Galway (city)
Republic of Ireland association footballers
Reading F.C. players
Leeds United F.C. players
Heart of Midlothian F.C. players
English Football League players
Irish expatriate sportspeople in England
Association football central defenders
Burton Albion F.C. players
Rochdale A.F.C. players
Scottish Professional Football League players
Mervue United A.F.C. players